1027 Aesculapia, provisional designation , is a Themistian asteroid from the outer region of the asteroid belt, approximately 33 kilometers in diameter.

It was discovered on 11 November 1923, by Belgian–American astronomer George Van Biesbroeck at Yerkes Observatory in Williams Bay, Wisconsin, United States. It is named for Aesculapius, the god of medicine in Greek mythology.

Classification and orbit 

Aesculapia is a member of the Themis family, a dynamical group of carbonaceous outer-belt asteroids which are known for their nearly coplanar ecliptical orbits. It orbits the Sun at a distance of 2.7–3.6 AU once every 5 years and 7 months (2,044 days). Its orbit has an eccentricity of 0.13 and an inclination of 1° with respect to the ecliptic.

Diameter and albedo 

According to the surveys carried out by the Infrared Astronomical Satellite IRAS, the Japanese Akari satellite, and NASA's Wide-field Infrared Survey Explorer with its subsequent NEOWISE mission, Aesculapia  measures between 31.225 and 38.55 kilometers in diameter, and its surface has an albedo between and 0.06 and 0.129.

The Collaborative Asteroid Lightcurve Link (CALL) derives an albedo of 0.075 and a diameter of 32.05 kilometers with an absolute magnitude of 10.9. Despite the body's low albedo, CALL classifies Aesculapia as a S-type rather than a C-type asteroid.

Photometry 

In the last 20 years, photometric observations of Aesculapia gave several rotational lightcurves with significantly divergent rotation periods. First results obtained by Chester Maleszewski and René Roy were only fragmentary or incorrect. Photometry at the Palomar Transient Factory and observations by Astronomer Steven Ehlert gave a period of 9.791 and 19.506 hours with a brightness amplitude of 0.09 and 0.19 magnitude, respectively. CALL currently adopts a lightcurve obtained by Kylie Hess at Oakley Southern Sky Observatory in March 2015, which gave a period of 13.529 hours and a brightness variation of 0.09 magnitude.

Naming 

This minor planet was named for Aesculapius, the Greek and Roman demigod of medicine and healing, son of Apollo and Coronis, after whom the asteroids 158 Koronis and 1862 Apollo are named, respectively. Naming citation was first mentioned in The Names of the Minor Planets by Paul Herget in 1955.

Notes

References

External links 
 Asteroid Lightcurve Database (LCDB), query form (info )
 Dictionary of Minor Planet Names, Google books
 Asteroids and comets rotation curves, CdR – Observatoire de Genève, Raoul Behrend
 Discovery Circumstances: Numbered Minor Planets (1)-(5000) – Minor Planet Center
 
 

001027
001027
Discoveries by George Van Biesbroeck
Named minor planets
19231111